SunFest is a musical and art festival held annually in the first week of May in West Palm Beach, Florida. SunFest is the state's largest waterfront music and art festival in Florida and attracts more than 100,000 visitors. Main attractions of this festival are the three stages featuring live music with a diverse array of musical styles including Pop, Hip-Hop, R&B, Soul, Funk, Latin, Reggae, Blues, Rock & Roll, Alternative Rock, Southern Rock, Hard Rock, Indie Rock, Jazz, Bluegrass, Country, Folk, Electronic, EDM, and Americana.

Notable acts have included AJR, Alabama Shakes, The Avett Brothers, Awolnation, Bastille, The Beach Boys, Billy Idol, The Black Crowes, Blink 182, Bob Dylan, Boston, Boyz II Men, Buddy Guy, Carrie Underwood, Cee Lo Green, Celia Cruz, Cheap Trick, Chuck Berry, Counting Crows, Cyndi Lauper, Damian Marley, Dizzy Gillespie, Duran Duran, Earth, Wind & Fire, Ed Sheeran, Fall Out Boy, Flo-Rida, George Clinton & Parliament-Funkadelic, Gregg Allman, G-Eazy, Hall & Oates, Herbie Hancock, Ice Cube, Isaac Hayes, J. Cole, Jackson Browne, James Brown, Jason Mraz, Jeff Beck, Jimmy Cliff, Joan Jett & The Blackhearts, John Legend, Jon Bellion, Joss Stone, Journey, Kendrick Lamar, Kool & the Gang, Little Richard,  Logic, Lynyrd Skynyrd, Mac Miller, Marshmello, Michael Bublé, Michael Franti & Spearhead, Musiq Soulchild, Nas, Ohio Players, Patti LaBelle, Pitbull, Pixies, Ray Charles, The Roots, Santana, ScHoolboy Q, The Smashing Pumpkins, Snoop Dogg, Stephen Stills, Steve Aoki, Steve Miller Band, Steve Winwood, The Temptations, The Wailers, The Wallflowers, War, Wilco, Willy Chirino, Wiz Khalifa, Ziggy Marley, and ZZ Top.

History 
The first SunFest in 1982 was a 10-day festival. The organizers incurred a debt that took three years to pay off, so they reduced the festival to three days in 1984. In 1986, its organizers decided to charge a $2 admission, and the event spanned five days by 1992. As of 2014, admission costs $25 at the gate, and its budget has expanded from $280,000 in 1984 to $2.2 million. The 1991 festival had the biggest crowd ever with 345,000 people. For 2018, the festival was reduced back to four days. Despite all the money and efforts to coordinate SunFest, it'll celebrate  years, because 2020 went on hiatus.

SunFestivites 
Some SunFestivies available at Sunfest to participate in are the Battle of the Bands, floating themed bars, the TGi5k and Art District. In the Art District you can immerse yourself in live artist demonstrations and performances. A crowd favorite is the ending firework show which captivates you and leaves you excited for the next SunFest. The many SunFestivites can vary by year.

Organizational history
SunFest was founded in 1982 by SunFest of Palm Beach Country Inc. This corporation consists of twenty-five board members, twenty-five committees, and more than eighty sponsors. One of these sponsors, the "Palm Beach Cultural Council," funds SunFest Music Festival annually as a way to promote art and culture in Palm Beach County. Other funders who have helped create the festival include:  The State of Florida, 'Department of State, 'Division of Cultural Affairs, and Florida Arts Council. These funders have allowed SunFest to be a private 501(c)3 non-profit organization. SunFest Music Festival has received a lot of referrals from the Palm Beach Cultural Council's executive director Will Ray. Ray's goal for Sunfest is to provide help to other cultural groups. Ray stated his beliefs about SunFest, "SunFest represents a very talented and experienced management and marketing force that should be used throughout the year," Ray said. "SunFest is really a giant in the festival industry because it has that management and revenue base."

References

Music festivals in Florida
Tourist attractions in Palm Beach County, Florida
West Palm Beach, Florida
1982 establishments in Florida
Recurring events established in 1982